Zethalia is a genus of sea snails in the subfamily Umboniinae of the family Trochidae, the top snails, first formally named in 1918.

Species
There is one extant (still living) species and two extinct species within the genus Zethalia:
 †Zethalia coronata Marwick, 1948
 †Zethalia russelli Marwick, 1965
 Zethalia zelandica (Hombron & Jacquinot, 1855)

References

 Trew, A., 1984. The Melvill-Tomlin Collection. Part 30. Trochacea. Handlists of the Molluscan Collections in the Department of Zoology, National Museum of Wales.
 Vaught, K. C. (1989). A classification of the living Mollusca. Melbourne, Florida : American Malacologists. xii + 189 pp.